Ostriv Velykyi Potomkin, also known as Ostrov Bol’shoy Potëmkin and Potemkin Island, is a river island located within the Dnipro river in the  of Kherson Raion of Kherson oblast of Ukraine.

Geography 

Ostriv Velykyi Potomkin is located within the Dnipro River as a river island. Two small lakes known as Lake Zakitne and Lake Nazarove-Pohorile are contained within the island. The island is divided into two parts by the Strait of Pudov, which flows through its center. The total land area of the island is approximately 25 square kilometers, located around 5 kilometers to the south of Kherson city and 2 kilometers to the north of the town of Hola Prystan.

History 
Being located along the historic route from the Varangians to the Greeks, Ostriv Velykyi Potomkin had strategic significance for the Kyivan Rus', who established settlements on it and used it as their primary Black Sea port. Regardless of which view is correct, archaeological excavations have found evidence of the island's settlement during the period of the Kyivan Rus'.

According to the Institute of Archaeology of the National Academy of Science of Ukraine, in the 14th century, Ostriv Velykyi Potomkin became a trade outpost for Republic of Genoa, becoming one of many Genoese colonies along the black sea.

After it was conquered by the Russian Empire, following the annexation of the Crimean Khanate in 1783, the island was renamed after Russian prince Grigory Potemkin, gaining the name it retains until today.

During the Second World War, Ostriv Velykyi Potomkin was used as an outpost by Ukrainian partisan detachments opposing the German occupation of Ukraine, who made use of the lower Dnipro river's floodplains to arrange sabotage operations against the Nazi German invaders.

Russian Invasion of Ukraine 

Following the 2022 Russian Invasion of Ukraine, Ostriv Velykyi Potomkin came under Russian occupation in the early period of the conflict as a result of the Southern Ukraine campaign. During the 2022 Ukrainian southern counteroffensive in November, it returned to Ukrainian control along with the nearby regional capital of Kherson. Due to its position on the front line in Southern Ukraine, it was constantly shelled by Russian forces, prompting Ukraine to announce the evacuation of civilians from the island on 3 December, although due to poor weather conditions this did not materialize.

Some Ukrainian officials, such as presidential advisor Oleksii Arestovych and Lieutenant Colonel Konstiantyn Mashovets, as well as some unofficial Russian sources, claimed on 9 December that Russian forces, specifically the 80th Arctic Motor Rifle Brigade, 25th Special Purpose Spetsnaz Regiment, and BARS-4 Special Combat Army Reserve, had re-occupied the island following a successful amphibious operation. Contradicting Khlan, the General Staff of the Ukrainian Armed Forces claimed on 15 December that Russia had begun forcibly deporting civilians from Ostriv Velykyi Potomkin, affirming that Russian forces controlled the island.

On 2 January 2023, Ukrainian sources, including member of the Ukrainian parliament Oleksii Honcharenko, claimed that some or all of the island had been recaptured by Ukraine, and a video soon appeared online showing Ukrainian forces present in its northeastern portion. This news was disputed by Russian sources, and was not officially confirmed by the Ukrainian government, with Serhii Khlan saying that such information existed but could not be confirmed. Footage was thereafter published showing Russian forces operating in nearby parts of the river delta, and a Russian military blogger claimed the island remained contested.

On 3 January 2023 , head of the Joint Press Center of the Defense Forces of the South of Ukraine, described talk of the island's capture from Russia as premature, and called announcements of such nature harmful. Yevhen Yerin, head of the Joint Press Center of the Defense Forces in the Tavria direction, stated on 4 January 2023 that Ostriv Velykyi Potomkin remained in a grey zone, being controlled by neither side. He added that it was unlikely Ukraine would be able to establish full control over the island before gaining control of east-bank Kherson.

On 6 March 2023, the Ukrainian Armed Forces reported the destruction of 2 Russian military observation posts and an ammunition depot on the island, claiming to have inflicted 18 casualties on Russian forces in the process. Additionally, the destruction of 3 motor boats being used by a Russian  was claimed, along with 3 anti-aircraft missile systems and 2 units of engineering equipment. Russian sources claimed on the following day, 7 March 2023, that the 126th Coastal Defence Brigade had repelled a Ukrainian attempt to assault Russian positions on the island.

References 

Archaeological sites in Ukraine
River islands of Ukraine
Islands of the Dnieper
Geography of Kherson Oblast